Chants Du Pashtou, is the alternative-indie and debut solo studio album by Pashtuns singer Zarsanga. The album was released on June 1, 1993 by Long Distance in Afghanistan.

Production and recording
The tracks used for the album were recorded at Bidi Studio, Paris in France.

Track listing

All music composed by Zarsanga and lyrics are collected.

References

External links

1993 debut albums
Zarsanga albums